John Lothrop Motley (April 15, 1814 – May 29, 1877) was an American author and diplomat. As a popular historian, he is best known for his works on the Netherlands, the three volume work The Rise of the Dutch Republic and four volume History of the United Netherlands. As United States Minister to Austria in the service of the Abraham Lincoln administration, Motley helped to prevent European intervention on the side of the Confederates in the American Civil War. He later served as Minister to the United Kingdom (Court of St. James) during the Ulysses S. Grant administration.

Biography 
John Lothrop Motley was born on April 15, 1814, in Dorchester, Massachusetts.  His grandfather, Thomas Motley, a jail-keeper (a public position) and innkeeper in Portland, Maine, had been a Freemason and radical sympathizer with the French Revolution.  Motley's father Thomas and uncle Edward served mercantile apprenticeships in Portland.

In 1802, Thomas Motley moved to Boston and established a commission house on India Wharf, taking his brother Edward with him as clerk. "Thomas and Edward Motley" became one of the leading commission houses in Boston. Thomas, married Anna Lothrop, daughter of the Rev. John Lathrop,  product of an old and distinguished line of Massachusetts clergymen. Like other successful Boston merchants of the period, Thomas Motley devoted a great part of his wealth to civic purposes and the education of his children. The brilliant accomplishments of his second son, J.L. Motley, are evidence of the care both the father and mother—known both for her learning and what Motley's boyhood friend Wendell Phillips called her "regal beauty"—bestowed on the boy's intellectual development.
Motley attended the Round Hill School and Boston Latin School, and graduated from Harvard in 1831.

His boyhood was spent in Dedham, near the site of the present day Noble and Greenough School on land purchased from Edward L. Penniman. His education included training in the German language and literature, and he went to Germany to complete these studies at Göttingen, during 1832–1833, during which time he became a lifelong friend of Otto von Bismarck. Motley and Bismarck studied civil law together at Frederick William University, Berlin.  Bismarck recalled his early impression of Motley: "He exercised a marked attraction by a conversation sparkling with wit, humor or originality....The most striking feature of his handsome and delicate appearance was his uncommonly large and beautiful eyes." After a period of European travel, Motley returned in 1834 to Boston, where he continued his legal studies.

In 1837 he married Mary Benjamin (died 1874). She came from a wealthy Boston family; her brother was Park Benjamin Sr. In 1839 he published anonymously a novel titled Morton's Hope, or the Memoirs of a Provincial, about life in a German university, based on his own experiences. It was poorly received, but has later been recognized for featuring a valuable portrayal of Bismarck, "thinly disguised as Otto von Rabenmarck", as a young student.

In 1841, Motley entered the U.S. diplomatic service as secretary of legation in St. Petersburg, Russia, but resigned his post within three months, because of the harsh climate, the expenses living there, and his reserved habits. Returning to Boston, he soon entered definitely upon a literary career. Besides contributing various historical and critical essays to the North American Review, such as "Life and Character of Peter the Great" (1845), and a remarkable essay on the "Polity of the Puritans", he published in 1849, again anonymously, a second novel, titled Merry Mount, a Romance of the Massachusetts Colony, based again on the odd history of Thomas Morton and Merrymount. He was elected a member of the American Antiquarian Society in 1856 and as a member to the American Philosophical Society in 1861.

Dutch history 

In 1846, Motley had begun to plan a history of the Netherlands, in particular the period of the United Provinces, and he had already done a large amount of work on this subject when, finding the materials at his disposal in the United States inadequate, he went with his wife and children to Europe in 1851. The next five years were spent at Dresden, Brussels, and The Hague in investigation of the archives, which resulted in 1856 in the publication of The Rise of the Dutch Republic, which became very popular. It speedily passed through many editions and was translated into Dutch, French, German, and Russian. In 1860, Motley published the first two volumes of its continuation, The United Netherlands. This work was on a larger scale and embodied the results of a still greater amount of original research. It was brought down to the truce of 1609 by two additional volumes, published in 1867.

Reception in Britain and the United States 
The books were popular and critical successes in both Britain and the United States, and multiple editions over the decades sold tens of thousands of copies. It was a favorite prize that schools awarded to their best students. Owen Edwards says of Motley, "He and he alone had created a Dutch awareness on a wide scale."

American critics have given the book mixed reviews. It was quite popular in its day, but modern scholars argue:

Reception in the Netherlands 
The reception of Motley's work in the Netherlands itself was not wholly favorable, especially as Motley described the Dutch struggle for independence in a flattering light, which caused some to argue he was biased against their opponents. Although historians like the orthodox Protestant Guillaume Groen van Prinsterer (whom Motley extensively quotes in his work) viewed him very favorably, the eminent liberal Dutch historian Robert Fruin (who was inspired by Motley to do some of his own best work, and who had reported already in 1856 in The Westminster Review Motley's edition on the Rise of the Dutch Republic) was critical of Motley's tendency to make up "facts" if they made for a good story. Though he admired Motley's gifts as an author, and stated that he continued to hold the work as a whole in high regard, he stressed it still required "addition and correction".

The humanist historian Johannes van Vloten was very critical, and responded to Fruin in 1860: "I agree less with your too favorable judgement....We cannot build on Motley['s foundation]; for that—apart from the little he copied from Groen's Archives and Gachard's Correspondences—for that his views are generally too obsolete."  Although appreciating his efforts to make Dutch history known among an English-speaking audience, Van Vloten argues that Motley's lack of knowledge of the Dutch language prevented him from sharing the latest insights of the Dutch historiographers, and made him vulnerable to bias in favor of Protestants and against Catholics.

American Civil War 
In 1861, just after outbreak of the American Civil War, Motley wrote two letters to The Times defending the Federal position, and these letters, afterwards reprinted as a pamphlet entitled Causes of the Civil War in America, made a favourable impression on President Lincoln.  At this point the English census of 1861 confirms that he was living with his wife and two daughters at 31 Hertford Street, in the parish of St George's, Hanover Square, London and describing himself as an 'author - history'.

Partly owing to this essay, Motley was appointed United States minister to the Austrian Empire in 1861, a position which he filled with distinction, working with other American diplomats such as John Bigelow and Charles Francis Adams to help prevent European intervention on the side of the Confederacy in the American Civil War. He resigned this position in 1867. Two years later, he was sent to represent his country as Ambassador to the United Kingdom, but in November 1870 he was recalled by President Grant. Motley had angered Grant when he completely disregarded Secretary of State Hamilton Fish's carefully drafted orders regarding settlement of the Alabama Claims. After a short visit to the Netherlands, Motley again went to live in England, where the Life and Death of John Barneveld, Advocate of Holland: with a View of the Primary Causes and Movements of the Thirty Years War appeared in two volumes in 1874.

Ill health now began to interfere with his literary work, and he died at Kingston Russell House, near Dorchester, Dorset, leaving three daughters. He was buried in Kensal Green Cemetery, London.

Selected works 
 Morton's Hope, or the Memoirs of a Provincial, 1839
 Life and Character of Peter the Great (North American Review), 1845
 On Balzac's Novels (North American Review), 1847
 Merry Mount, a Romance of the Massachusetts Colony, 1849
 Polity of the Puritans (North American Review), 1849
 The Rise of the Dutch Republic, 3 vol., 1856
 Florentine Mosaics (Atlantic Monthly), 1857
 History of the United Netherlands, 4 vol., 1860–67
 Causes of the Civil War in America (from The Times), 1861
 Historic Progress and American Democracy, 1868
 Review of S. E. Henshaw's History of the Work of the North-West Sanitary Commission (Atlantic Monthly), 1868
 Democracy, the Climax of Political Progress and the Destiny of Advanced Races: an Historical Essay, 1869. (Pamphlet reprint of "Historic Progress and American Democracy," listed above.)
 The Life and Death of John of Barneveld, 2 vol., 1874

References

Further reading 
 
 Edwards, Owen Dudley. "John Lothrop Motley and the Netherlands." BMGN-Low Countries Historical Review 97.3 (1982): 561-588. online
 Guberman, Joseph. The Life of John Lothrop Motley (Springer, 2012).
 Haight, Gordon S. "The Publication of Motley's Rise of the Dutch Republic." The Yale University Library Gazette (1980): 135-140 online.
 Kaplan, Lawrence S. "The Brahmin as Diplomat in Nineteenth Century America: Everett Bancroft Motley Lowell." Civil War History 19.1 (1973): 5-28.
 Putnam, Ruth. "Prescott and Motley," Cambridge History of  American Literature (1918), 2:131-47,  501-03. online
 Sommers, William. "John Lothrop Motley: The Witty US Minister to Vienna" Foreign Vistas: Stories from a Life in the Foreign Service. (2017), p. 1+. online
 Steinberg, Jonathan. "The American connection: John Lothrop Motley, George Bancroft and Andrew Dickson White. Eminent Americans and Otto von Bismarck." Realpolitik für Europa (Verlag Ferdinand Schöningh, 2016) pp. 267–280.

Primary sources 
 The Rise of the Dutch Republic, 3 vol., 1856; many editions  online
 History of the United Netherlands, 4 vol., 1860–67; many editions online
  
 
 Motley, John Lothrop. The Correspondence of John Lothrop Motley (G.W. Curtis, ed. 3 vol. Harper & brothers, 1889). vol 1 online; also  vol 2 online; and vol 3 online

External links 

 
 
 

1814 births
1877 deaths
19th-century American historians
19th-century American male writers
Boston Latin School alumni
Ambassadors of the United States to Austria
Ambassadors of the United States to the United Kingdom
Historians of Europe
Harvard University alumni
Humboldt University of Berlin alumni
19th-century American diplomats
Writers from Dedham, Massachusetts
Hall of Fame for Great Americans inductees
Burials at Kensal Green Cemetery
Members of the American Antiquarian Society
Historians of the Dutch Republic
People from Dorchester, Massachusetts
Historians from Massachusetts
Diplomats from Dedham, Massachusetts
American male non-fiction writers